Anacampsis comparanda is a moth of the family Gelechiidae. It was described by Edward Meyrick in 1929. It is found in North America, where it has been recorded from Arizona and Texas.

The wingspan is 13–14 mm. The forewings are grey, somewhat sprinkled whitish, with some blackish scales. The stigmata form small suffused rather darker grey spots, the plical rather before the first discal, a similar spot in the disc at one-fourth. There are whitish opposite dots on the costa and dorsum at two-thirds, four or five small blackish marginal dots around the apex. The hindwings are light grey.

References

Moths described in 1929
Anacampsis
Moths of North America